This article describes the knockout stage of the 2017–18 Women's EHF Champions League.

Qualified teams
The top four placed teams from each of the two main round groups advanced to the knockout stage.

Format
The first-placed team of each group faces the fourth-placed team, and the second-placed team will play against the third-placed team from the other group. After that a draw will be held to determine the pairings for the final four.

Quarterfinals

Overview

|}

Matches

Győri ETO won 56–48 on aggregate.

Rostov-Don won 63–51 on aggregate.

CSM București won 54–48 on aggregate.

HC Vardar won 56–48 on aggregate.

Final four
The final four was held at the László Papp Budapest Sports Arena in Budapest, Hungary on 12 and 13 May 2018. The draw took place on 17 April 2018.

Bracket

Semifinals

Third place game

Final

References

External links
Final four website

knockout stage